William Kelly Simpson (January 3, 1928 – March 24, 2017) was an American professor of Egyptology, Archaeology, Ancient Egyptian literature, and Afro-Asiatic languages at Yale University.

He was one of several co-directors of the University of Pennsylvania Museum Yale University Expedition to Abydos, Egypt, which conducts archaeological excavations of ancient sites. He was elected to the American Philosophical Society in 1983.

Personal life 
Simpson was born on January 3, 1928, in New York City, to Kenneth F. Simpson (1895-1941) and Helen-Louise Knickerbacker Porter (1893-1981).

He married Marilyn Ellen Milton (1931—1980), a granddaughter of philanthropists John Davison Rockefeller Jr. William and Marilyn have two children:
 Laura Knickerbacker Simpson (1954-2012)
 Abigail Rockefeller Simpson (born 1958), married Todd Mydland.

Simpson died on March 24, 2017, at the age of 89.

Literature 
Peter Manuelian (editor): Studies in Honor of William Kelly Simpson, Museum of Fine Arts, Boston 1996

See also
 List of Egyptologists

References

American Egyptologists
Yale University faculty
1928 births
2017 deaths

Members of the American Philosophical Society